Helmi Boxberger (born 7 March 1950) is a German former swimmer. She competed at the 1968 Summer Olympics and the 1972 Summer Olympics. In 1968, she competed in the women's 100 metre freestyle, women's 200 metre individual medley and women's 4 × 100 metre freestyle relay events. In 1972, she competed in the women's 200 metre individual medley and women's 400 metre individual medley events.

References

External links
 

1950 births
Living people
German female swimmers
Olympic swimmers of West Germany
Swimmers at the 1968 Summer Olympics
Swimmers at the 1972 Summer Olympics
People from Altötting (district)
German female freestyle swimmers
Sportspeople from Upper Bavaria